was a J-pop musical trio active between 1982 and 1985.

History of the band 
The group was established as part of the Net TV's variety show  hosted by Kinichi Hagimoto. The group consisted of Atsumi Kurasawa, Tomoko Takabe and Mami Takahashi and made the first appearance in the show in September 1982. 

In June 1983, the weekly magazine Focus published a photograph of Tomoko Takabe allegedly smoking on her bed.  Following the incident she was suspended, and took part in the program on the phone expressing her remorse and singing " Medaka no Kyôdai"; her segment of the show recorded a massive 42 percent share of viewers. She was supposed to return but two months later the Takabe's ex-boyfriend who had provided the photo to the magazine committed suicide, and she decided to withdraw from the program and from the group. The two remaining members eventually disbanded the group in 1985. Warabe's major hit was the song ""Moshimo Ashita ga..." which topped the Oricon Singles Chart for six weeks.

Group members 

 Atsumi Kurasawa (born 20 April 1967), nicknamed Kanae.
 Tomoko Takabe (born 27 August 1967),  nicknamed Nozomi.
 Mami Takahashi (born 20 September 1967), nicknamed Tamae.

Discography 
Albums 
 1983 : Nozomi, Kanae, Tamae - Medaka no Kyôdai
 1984 : Moshi mo Ashita ga...
 1995 : Medaka no Kyôdai (Compilation)  
 2011 : Imokin Trio & Warabe - Golden Best (Compilation)

References

External links

 
Musical groups established in 1982
Musical groups disestablished in 1985
Japanese pop music groups
Japanese idol groups
Japanese girl groups